The Bright Midnight Sampler (in Europe entitled Bright Midnight: Live in America), is a compilation CD of live performances by American rock band the Doors, released September 25, 2000.

Background 
Recorded between July 1969 and August 1970, the collection contains 14 songs from 8 concerts performed in the United States.  The CD, remastered by long-time Doors sound engineer and producer Bruce Botnick, was the first official publication released from the Bright Midnight Archives collection containing previously unreleased live concerts by the Doors.

Bright Midnight: Live in America 

Bright Midnight: Live in America is the British version of the album which was released by Elektra on CD as a limited edition. The CD is the first American production by Bright Midnight Archives, and features an extract from the extensive archival material recorded live, which the band released in the following years with the label Bright Midnight Archives.

Track listings

Personnel 
 Jim Morrison – vocals,  harmonica on "The End"
 Ray Manzarek – keyboard bass, organ
 Robby Krieger – electric guitar
 John Densmore – drums
 Bruce Botnick – production and mastering
 Danny Sugerman – manager

References

2000 compilation albums
2000 live albums
Albums produced by Bruce Botnick
Bright Midnight Archives
Elektra Records live albums
The Doors compilation albums